Highway 85 (MT 85) is a  north–south state highway traversing the central Gallatin Valley in the U.S. State of Montana. From Four Corners, U.S. Route 191 (US 191) runs east to Bozeman, and south to West Yellowstone; MT 84 travels west to Norris; and MT 85 runs north to Belgrade. The designated MT 85 terminates near the southern end of Belgrade, at an interchange with Interstate 90 (I-90).

Route description
Highway 85 begins at an intersection with US 191 and Highway 84 in the census-designated place of Four Corners.  US 191 enters the intersection from the south and turns east, Highway 84 heads west, and Highway 85 starts heading north.  The highway is entirely straight from beginning to end. The southern three quarters of the route are along a two-lane highway.  Once it reaches Belgrade, it expands to a four-lane road with a center turning lane.  The route ends at a partial cloverleaf interchange with I-90 in Belgrade.  The road continues north as Jackrabbit Lane, its street name in Belgrade.

History
Before receiving its current designation, Highway 85 was designated as Montana Secondary Highway 291.

Major intersections

References

085
Transportation in Gallatin County, Montana